Allan Kamwanga (born 30 October 1968) is a Zambian former footballer who played as a defender. He played in 35 matches for the Zambia national team from 1994 to 1999. He was also named in Zambia's squad for the 1998 African Cup of Nations tournament.

References

External links
 

1968 births
Living people
Zambian footballers
Association football defenders
Zambia international footballers
1998 African Cup of Nations players
Zambia Super League players
Mufulira Wanderers F.C. players
Place of birth missing (living people)